Albert Fritz (30 May 1947 – 1 September 2019) was a German racing cyclist. He rode in the 1971 Tour de France.

References

External links
 

1947 births
2019 deaths
German male cyclists
Place of birth missing
Tour de Suisse stage winners
People from Schaffhausen
Sportspeople from the canton of Schaffhausen
Cyclists from Baden-Württemberg